BV Cloppenburg is a German association football club located in Cloppenburg, Lower Saxony.

History
The club was founded after World War I in 1919 as the successor to SV Cloppenburg 1911. Through the 1950s they played in the Amateurliga Niedersachsen-West (II), and in the 1960s in the Verbandsliga Niedersachsen West (III), before falling out of sight in the early-1970s to become an obscure local side. In recent years, BV managed to rise as high as the third division Regionalliga Nord in 1998 for a couple of seasons, before falling back to the Oberliga Niedersachsen/Bremen (IV).

After four seasons in the Regionalliga Nord (IV) Cloppenburg was relegated back to the Oberliga at the end of the 2015–16 season.

The club won their first DFB-Pokal berth in the 2006–07 tournament by way of a Niedersachsen Cup win last season over third division side VfL Osnabrück. They were eliminated from the competition in the first round after losing 1–0 to Bundesliga side 1. FC Nürnberg at home.

Stadium
Cloppenburg plays its home games in the Stadion an der Friesoyther Strasse (now named TimePartner Arena) which has a capacity of 6,000 (~2,000 seats). Work on improving the venue by expanding it was recently undertaken, and the installation of floodlights is being considered.

Honours
The club's honours:
 Oberliga Niedersachsen/Bremen
 Champions: 1995
 Verbandsliga Niedersachsen
 Champions: 1993
 Lower Saxony Cup
 Winners: 2006

Former managers
 Franz Gerber
 Wolfgang Steinbach
 Hubert Hüring
 Tom Saintfiet
 Jörg Uwe Klütz
 Alexander Woloschin
 Jörg Goslar

References

External links
Official team site 
Das deutsche Fußball-Archiv historical German football league tables 

 
Football clubs in Germany
Football clubs in Lower Saxony
Association football clubs established in 1919
1919 establishments in Germany
Cloppenburg
Cloppenburg (district)